Our Blood is a studio album by avant-garde American musician Richard Buckner. It was released in August 2011 by Merge Records.

Track listing

References

2011 albums
Richard Buckner (musician) albums
Merge Records albums